The Teesdale Mercury is a family-owned rural weekly newspaper in County Durham in the United Kingdom, which has been published since 1854. It is based in the town of Barnard Castle, and has printing facilities there, which were used to print the paper until it switched to colour in 2015.  The paper, along with its sister publication the Wear Valley Mercury, are owned by Lord Barnard.

References

External links 

Weekly newspapers published in the United Kingdom
1854 establishments in England
Newspapers published in County Durham
Publications established in 1854
Printing companies of the United Kingdom